is a Japanese sports shooter. He competed in the men's trap event at the 2020 Summer Olympics.

References

External links
 

1981 births
Living people
Japanese male sport shooters
Olympic shooters of Japan
Shooters at the 2020 Summer Olympics
Shooters at the 2014 Asian Games
Sportspeople from Saitama Prefecture
Asian Games competitors for Japan
21st-century Japanese people